A Gathering of Demons is an independent EP from heavy metal band Reverend. This is the last Reverend offering to feature the vocals of longtime singer David Wayne.

Track listing

Lineup
David Wayne: Vocals
Chris Nelson: Guitars
John Stahlman: Bass
Todd Stotz: Drums

2001 EPs
Reverend (band) albums